Vejle Amts Avis was a regional newspaper based in Vejle, Denmark, the paper covered the former Vejle County and officially supported the Conservative People's Party while Vejle Amts Folkeblad supported Venstre.

History
Vejle Amts Avis was founded in 1828 by Sylveste Hertz (1790-854) in association with the publishing house later known as Schweitzers Bogtrykkeri, se dette).

See also
 Vejle Amts Folkeblad

References 

1828  establishments in Denmark
Defunct newspapers published in Denmark
Danish-language newspapers
Danish companies established in 1828 
Publications established in 1828